Alatyrsky District  (Ulatăr rayonĕ) is an administrative and municipal district (raion), one of the twenty-one in the Chuvash Republic, Russia. It is located in the south of the republic. Its administrative center is the town of Alatyr (which is not administratively a part of the district). Population:  21,630 (2002 Census);

Administrative and municipal status
Within the framework of administrative divisions, Alatyrsky District is one of the twenty-one in the republic. The town of Alatyr serves as its administrative center, despite being incorporated separately as a town of republic significance—an administrative unit with the status equal to that of the districts.

As a municipal division, the district is incorporated as Alatyrsky Municipal District. The town of republic significance of Alatyr is incorporated separately from the district as Alatyr Urban Okrug.

References

Notes

Sources

Districts of Chuvashia

